The Kaitai Bridge is a historic stone arch bridge over a tributary of the Grand Canal in , Danyang, Jiangsu, China.

History
Kaitai Bridge was originally built between 1572 and 1620 during the Wanli era of the Ming dynasty (1368–1644), but because of war and natural disasters has been rebuilt numerous times since then. In December 2011, it has been inscribed as a provincial-level cultural heritage site by the Government of Jiangsu.

References

Bridges in Jiangsu
Arch bridges in China
Qing dynasty architecture
Danyang, Jiangsu